WKTN is one of two radio stations operating in Hardin County, Ohio, United States. The other station is WOHA, a Catholic religion radio station. The format of WKTN is hot adult contemporary. It is currently owned by Home Town Media Ltd.

Sports
WKTN broadcasts the competitions of the Kenton Wildcats, the sports teams of Kenton High School, as well as other county and regional school sports. Programs are usually hosted by Chad Spencer or Bob Simmons with the play-by-play and Jim Homan with color commentary. In addition the station also carries the games of the Ohio State University's football team.

External links
WKTN official website

Hot adult contemporary radio stations in the United States
Kenton, Ohio
KTN